Wapella can refer to:

 Wapella, Illinois, a village in the United States
 Wapella, Saskatchewan, a town in Canada